Big Beat Records is a British record label and import distributor owned by Ace Records, specialising in garage rock.

Roster
Releases include:

The Ace of Cups
Big Star
Dean Carter
The Chocolate Watchband
Count Five
Creedence Clearwater Revival
The Cramps 
The Damned 
Fifty Foot Hose
The Flaming Stars
Frumious Bandersnatch
The Fugs
Guana Batz
Dan Hicks
Bert Jansch
Janie Jones & the Lash
Larry and the Blue Notes
Mahogany Rush
Mighty Baby
Motörhead
The Music Machine
The Nightcrawlers
The Rationals
John Renbourn
The Screaming Blue Messiahs
She 
The Sting-rays
The Sonics
Sharon Tandy
The Zombies

See also
 List of record labels

References

External links
Official page, Acerecords.co.uk

British record labels
Reissue record labels
Garage rock record labels
Record labels established in 1979